is a railway station in the city of Minamiuonuma, Niigata, Japan, operated by East Japan Railway Company (JR East).

Lines

Station layout
The station consists of two ground-level opposed unnumbered side platforms  serving two tracks, connected by a level crossing. There is no station building, but only a weather shelter on each platform. The station is unattended.

Platforms

History 
The station opened on 1 January 1965. With the privatization of Japanese National Railways (JNR) on 1 April 1987, the station came under the control of JR East.

Surrounding area
Minami-Koide Industrial Park

See also
 List of railway stations in Japan

External links
  Yairo Station (JR East)

Railway stations in Niigata Prefecture
Stations of East Japan Railway Company
Railway stations in Japan opened in 1965
Jōetsu Line
Minamiuonuma